Mahmut Demir (born 1982) is a Turkish-Austrian futsal player.  He currently plays for Stella Rossa Vienna and previously played for Austria 13.

He is a member of the Turkey national futsal team in the UEFA Futsal Championship.

External links 
 Player profile at club page 

1982 births
Living people
Turkish men's futsal players
Austrian people of Turkish descent
Date of birth missing (living people)